This is a list of seasons played by Beitar Ramla Football Club in Israeli and European football, from 1953 (when the club first played in the Israeli football league system) to the most recent completed season, including seasons in which the club was merged with Maccabi Ramla (between 2000 and 2011, playing as Ironi Ramla) and with Beitar Tel Aviv (starting from 2011, playing as Beitar Tel Aviv Ramla). It details the club's achievements in major competitions, and the top scorers for each season. Top scorers in bold were also the top scorers in the Israeli league that season. Records of minor competitions such as the Lilian Cup are not included due to them being considered of less importance than the State Cup and the Toto Cup.

History
Beitar Ramla was established in 1951 and worked its way up the Israeli football league system, reaching the second tier in 1963 and playing a total of 20 seasons at the second division. During the 1990s the club suffered financially, eventually folding in the middle of the 1998–99 season The folded club merged with Maccabi Ramla to form Ironi Ramla, which started to play in the lowest division, Liga Gimel, and managed to promote twice, to Liga Alef within the next seven seasons. However, backing from the Municipality of Ramla was cut and the club once again suffered financially. In 2011 the club merged with Beitar Tel Aviv to form Beitar Tel Aviv Ramla, which played in second division Liga Leumit.

Seasons

As Beitar Ramla

As Ironi Ramla

As Beitar Tel Aviv Ramla

Key

 P = Played
 W = Games won
 D = Games drawn
 L = Games lost
 F = Goals for
 A = Goals against
 Pts = Points
 Pos = Final position

 Leumit = Liga Leumit (National League)
 Artzit = Liga Artzit (Nationwide League)
 Premier = Liga Al (Premier League)
 Pal. League = Palestine League

 F = Final
 Group = Group stage
 QF = Quarter-finals
 QR1 = First Qualifying Round
 QR2 = Second Qualifying Round
 QR3 = Third Qualifying Round
 QR4 = Fourth Qualifying Round
 RInt = Intermediate Round

 R1 = Round 1
 R2 = Round 2
 R3 = Round 3
 R4 = Round 4
 R5 = Round 5
 R6 = Round 6
 SF = Semi-finals

Notes

References

Beitar Tel Aviv Bat Yam F.C.
 
Beitar Ramla